Gomphidius is a genus of mushrooms, commonly known as spike-caps, that are members of the Boletales (suborder Suillineae), or pored fungi. They appear to have gill-like structures which resemble those of agarics, however the similarity is superficial only. The best-known member is the slimy spike-cap (Gomphidius glutinosus). The genus has a widespread distribution, especially in north temperate areas, and contains 10 species.

Taxonomy
Elias Magnus Fries initially described the genus as Agaricus subgenus Gomphus in 1821, before renaming it Gomphidius in 1825.

The genus gives its name to the family Gomphidiaceae. Despite being agaricoid (bearing gills) the genus (and family) belong to the Boletales (suborder Suillineae). The related genus Chroogomphus (whose species were once classified in  Gomphidius), is distinguished by the lack of a partial veil.

The genus name is derived from the Greek 'γομφος' gomphos meaning 'plug' or 'large wedge-shaped nail'.

Fries did not designate a type species, but G. glutinosus was later designated the lectotype as it was the first species listed.

Miller subdivided the genus into three sections, section Microsporus, typified by small spores, with G. oregonensis as the type, section Roseogomphus, typified by large spores and pink cap, with G. subroseus as its type, and section Gomphidius.

Miller published a molecular analysis of the Gomphidiaceae in 2003, though material was not available from all taxa. The results showed G. flavipes and G. pseudoflavipes were sister taxa and their lineage was sister to a Japan-provenance material of G. roseus. G. glutinosus and G. oregonensis were sister taxa with G. smithii, G. subroseus and  G. nigricans as progressively earlier offshoots. G. maculatus diverged from the ancestor of these eight species, and  Gomphidius borealis may be an early offshoot that is basal to the split between Chroogomphus and Gomphidius. Miller suggested that the gasteroid species Gomphogaster leucosarx may lie within Gomphidius but did not analyse that taxon genetically.

List of species

Description
The members of the genus have pink- to purple-, grey- or brown-tinted caps that have a sticky surface and a varnished appearance when dry. They have white gills.

Distribution and habitat
The genus occurs in coniferous forests throughout North America, Eurasia and North Africa. Gomphidius species associate with members of the subfamilies Piceoideae (Picea), Laricoideae (Larix and Pseudotsuga) and Abietoideae (Abies and Tsuga) within the Pinaceae.

References

Boletales
Boletales genera
Taxa named by Elias Magnus Fries
Taxa described in 1836